Harry Traherne Moggridge  (born 1936) is a British architect and  landscape architect, co-founder of Colvin & Moggridge with Brenda Colvin, and former Professor of Landscape Architecture at Sheffield University; a past president of the Landscape Institute and a commissioner of the Royal Fine Art Commission.

Early life
Moggridge was born in London and is the son of Lt-Col Harry Weston Moggridge CMG.

Moggridge trained as an architect, but over time, became primarily a landscape architect.

Career
In 1965 Moggridge first met Brenda Colvin, and in 1969, she took him on as a business partner, and the practice became Colvin & Moggridge.

Moggridge designed Youlbury House, built from 1969 to 1971 as a weekend home for the barrister William Goodhart (now Lord Goodhart) and his wife Celia Goodhart, who was Moggridge's sister-in-law. It has been Grade II listed since 2009.

Moggridge received a CBE for services to landscape architecture.

Personal life
In 1962, he married Hon. Catherine Grevile Herbert (born September 1942), the younger daughter of Dennis Herbert, 2nd Baron Hemingford and the younger sister of The 3rd Baron Hemingford. They have a daughter and two sons together.

References

External links
 Colvin & Moggridge

Commanders of the Order of the British Empire
English landscape architects
Living people
1936 births
Architects from London